Ethan Payne (born 20 June 1995), better known as Behzinga, is an English YouTuber, streamer, and Internet personality. He produces videos on gaming, football, comedy, and fitness, and is a co-founder and member of the British YouTube group Sidemen. He, as well as other Sidemen members co-founded XIX Vodka, and a restaurant chain known as Sides. In 2019, Payne was listed as the 31st most influential online creator in the United Kingdom by The Sunday Times. , his main YouTube channel has over 4 million subscribers and 500 million video views.

Early life and education 
Payne was born on 20 June 1995 in London and was raised almost entirely by his mother Ruth, who battled with cancer during his childhood. His biological father left before he was born and his stepfather, whom he had met when he was six months old and believed was his actual father, left when he was thirteen, due to drug addiction and debt. Payne attended Marshalls Park School, and then studied video games development at South Essex College.

Career 
Payne registered the "Behzinga" YouTube channel on 24 February 2012 while he was still in school. He explained that the name comes from one of his favourite television series The Big Bang Theory in which Sheldon Cooper often uses the catchphrase "Bazinga!"; Payne altered the spelling. His early content primarily featured video game commentaries of the Call of Duty and FIFA video game series. Over time, his style of content diversified to include football, comedy, and fitness videos.

On 19 October 2013, Payne and four other British YouTubers formed the entertainment collective Ultimate Sidemen, later shortened to simply Sidemen. Since 2014, the group has consisted of seven British YouTubers: Vikram Barn (Vikkstar123), Joshua Bradley (Zerkaa), Tobi Brown (TBJZL), Harry Lewis (W2S), Simon Minter (Miniminter), JJ Olatunji (KSI), and Payne. The group produces online videos, most often consisting of challenges, sketches and video-game commentary, as well as selling exclusive Sidemen merchandise.

In September 2019, Payne was listed as the 31st most influential online creator in the United Kingdom by The Sunday Times. That November, he provided commentary for KSI vs. Logan Paul II for Sky Sports Box Office.

In October 2020, he starred in the three-episode YouTube Originals documentary series How to Be Behzinga about his struggle with depression and his path towards running the London Marathon to raise money for the Teenage Cancer Trust. He revealed that he had previously been suffering from alcoholism and wanted to take his own life, but with support from his fellow Sidemen members, he was able to overcome his challenges. Also during a stretch of time between 2018 and 2019, he had lost .

He has become an advocate for mental health and has talked about the importance of sharing feelings and breaking down the stigma surrounding mental illness in men.

Personal life 
Payne is a supporter of West Ham United F.C. He and his girlfriend, Faith Louisa Kelly, have a child together, born in September 2022.

Filmography

References

External links 
 
 
 
 

1995 births
British video bloggers
Comedy YouTubers
English male web series actors
English male writers
Gaming YouTubers
Health and fitness YouTubers
Let's Players
Living people
People educated at Marshalls Park School
Twitch (service) streamers
Video game commentators
YouTube vloggers
YouTubers from London
English YouTubers